Mihnea Berindei (22 March 1948 – 19 June 2016) was a Romanian-born French historian.

He was born in Bucharest, the son of historian Dan Berindei, and studied at the Faculty of History of the University of Bucharest from 1966 to 1970. He went to Turkey to find documentation, and then went to Paris, where he studied at the École pratique des hautes études, graduating in 1972.

After the Romanian Revolution of 1989, Berindei was instrumental in the creation of the Group for Social Dialogue.

On 22 June 2016, Romanian President Klaus Iohannis awarded post-mortem to Berindei the National Order of Faithful Service, Knight rank.

References 

1948 births
2016 deaths
Writers from Bucharest
University of Bucharest alumni
20th-century Romanian historians
Scholars of Ottoman history
Romanian anti-communists
Romanian expatriates in France
École pratique des hautes études alumni
Recipients of the National Order of Faithful Service